Israel competed at the 2022 Winter Olympics in Beijing, China, from 4 to 20 February 2022.

Figure skater Evgeni Krasnopolski and alpine ski racer Noa Szőllős were chosen as the nation's flag bearers at the opening ceremony. A volunteer was the flagbearer during the closing ceremony.

The Israeli delegation did not win any medals at these games. Barnabás Szőllős' sixth-place finish in the men's combined downhill was the best result attained so far by an Israeli athlete at the Winter Olympics.

Competitors
The Israeli delegation included 6 athletes, competing in 3 disciplines.

Alpine skiing

Israel qualified two male and one female athletes for alpine skiing, but declined one male quota. Noa Szőllős and her brother Barnabás Szőllős were selected by the Olympic Committee of Israel to compete for the country.

Barnabas Szőllős’ sixth-place finish overall in the combined  Alpine skiing event was Israel's best Olympic skiing result to date.

Figure skating

In the 2021 World Figure Skating Championships in Stockholm, Sweden, Oleksii Bychenko finished in 24th place with 190.45 points, and earned one quota place for the Israeli delegation in the men's event. In the 2021 Nebelhorn Trophy in Oberstdorf, Germany, Hailey Kops and Evgeni Krasnopolski finished in 5th place with 167.08 points, and earned one quota place for the Israeli delegation in the pairs event.

Bychenko, Kops, and Krasnopolski were chosen by the Olympic Committee of Israel to represent Israel at the games. This was Bychenko and Krasnopolski's third appearance at the Olympic Games.

Short track speed skating 

Israel won a quota place after Vladislav Bykanov participated in the 2021–22 ISU Short Track Speed Skating World Cup Competitions according to the Special Olympic
Qualification Classification. The Olympic Committee of Israel chose Bykanov to represent Israel at the games. This was Bykanov's third appearance at the Olympic Games.

Bykanov advanced to the semi-finals of the 1500m. It was the first time in eight attempts at the Winter Olympics that he advanced past the first stage.

Men

References

Nations at the 2022 Winter Olympics
2022
Winter Olympics